Sainte-Cécile-de-Lévrard is a parish municipality in the Centre-du-Québec region of the province of Quebec in Canada.

Demographics 

See also
List of parish municipalities in Quebec

References

External links

Parish municipalities in Quebec
Incorporated places in Centre-du-Québec